Somerset is an unincorporated community recognized as a local urban district in the Municipality of Lorne within the Canadian province of Manitoba that held village status prior to January 1, 2015.

Somerset has a clinic, gas station, restaurant, two churches, a drive-in, a hotel, a grain elevator, a high school, a curling rink, a skating rink and a library. The community is also home to the large concrete plant, Boulet Brothers Concrete.

Demographics 

Climate

References 

Designated places in Manitoba
Former villages in Manitoba
Local urban districts in Manitoba
Pembina Valley Region
Populated places disestablished in 2015
2015 disestablishments in Manitoba